Derek Isaac Kallicharran (born 4 April 1958) is a former first class cricketer. The brother of Alvin Kallicharran, Derek played for Guyana at Under-19 level and with the senior side in the Shell Shield. In 1983 he toured Zimbabwe with the West Indies 'B'.

After joining the Eastern American Cricket Association he appeared in the 1994 ICC Trophy for the United States and again three years later.

1958 births
Living people
Guyanese cricketers
American cricketers
Berbice cricketers
Guyanese emigrants to the United States
People from East Berbice-Corentyne
Guyana cricketers